Founded in 1983, Miss Indian World is a five-day competition held in Albuquerque, New Mexico. The event is part of the annual Gathering of Nations, the largest Native American powwow in the world.  Young women from across North America represent their tribes and communities as they compete to win the crown. Rather than emphasizing contestants' outward appearance, Miss Indian World aims to select a winner who demonstrates a deep understanding of her culture, traditions, people and history.

Once awarded the title, Miss Indian World acts as a cultural representative, promoting individually-selected platforms, sharing Native American culture, and representing the annual Gathering of Nations event. This role is important to the native community because it helps perpetuate traditions and overturn negative stereotypes.

In addition to the title, Miss Indian World also wins prize money, the Miss Indian shawl and banner, a four-day ocean cruise, and a travel stipend to attend powwows, conferences, workshops, and festivals. Previous Miss Indian World winners have continued to be sought-after speakers, even after they have passed on the crown.

Competition requirements 
To qualify for Miss Indian World, contestants must be native or indigenous Americans between the ages of 18 and 24 as age requirements were updated for the 2018 pageant with a verifiable tribal affiliation. They must also be single, never married, and have no dependents.

Each contestant participates in four categories: Public Speaking and Personal Interviews, Traditional Talent Presentation, Dance Competition, and Essay. Contestants are evaluated based on their skill, as well as cultural knowledge about tribes and traditions. The woman who accumulates the most points in each category will hold the Miss Indian World title for one year.

Winner history

References

External links 
 Miss Indian World Homepage at the Gathering of Nations website

Beauty pageants in the United States
Native American culture